Brezovec is a settlement in the Municipality of Cirkulane in the Haloze area of eastern Slovenia. The area traditionally belonged to the Styria region. It is now included in the Drava Statistical Region.

References

External links
Brezovec on Geopedia

Populated places in the Municipality of Cirkulane